Centro is a neighbourhood of Belo Horizonte, located in the central region of the city.

References

Neighbourhoods in Belo Horizonte